Chipola is an unincorporated community in Calhoun County, Florida, United States.

Geography
Chipola is on State Road 71, north of the Calhoun County Airport.

References

Unincorporated communities in Calhoun County, Florida
Unincorporated communities in Florida